Ton Masseurs (born 7 December 1947, in Kaatsheuvel, the Netherlands) is a Dutch guitarist noted as one of the first pedal steel guitar players in Europe. He was the lead guitar/steel guitar player, and a founding member, of the Dutch Country and Western band The Tumbleweeds, who had a number one hit with their version of the Merle Haggard song "Somewhere Between" (1975). Masseurs was the band's musical leader and producer.

After their early success, the band began to rotate members. By 1982, Ton Masseurs and his brother Berry Masseurs were all that remained from the 1975 lineup. Masseurs stopped performing to focus on his music studio, which he had started in 1980, called MMP Studios in Waalwijk, the Netherlands. 
He did remain active as a session musician on pedal steel. He worked with Dutch acts like Rob de Nijs, Jasperina de Jong and The Golden Earring among others.

From 1980 to 2001 he was a notable music producer in the Dutch music scene. in September 2001 he suffered a major heart attack and retired from the music industry.

Style 
Ton Masseurs' style was noted for very fast playing and near-perfect intonation. This was made possible by his perfect pitch.

Masseurs was noted for playing wearing socks with no shoes.

Gear 
Ton Masseurs was an avid user of Sho-Bud steel guitars. He used two Sho-Bud amplifiers and a Custom III Sho-Bud pedal steel guitar. When he played standard guitar, his main instruments were a 1969 Rosewood Telecaster, and a 1966 Gretsch Country Gentleman.

References

1947 births
Living people
Dutch guitarists
Dutch male guitarists
Pedal steel guitarists
People from Loon op Zand